Jeffrey D. Stenquist (born December 31, 1969) is an American politician and software developer serving as a member of the Utah House of Representatives from the 51st district. Elected in November 2018, he assumed office on January 2, 2019.

Education 
Stenquist was born in Tremonton, Utah. He earned a Bachelor of Science degree in computer science from the University of Utah.

Career 
Since graduating from college, Stenquist has worked as a software engineer and software architect at Data2Logistics and O.C. Tanner. In 2004 and 2005, Stenquist was a member of the Draper City Planning Commission. From 2005 to 2017, Stenquist was a member of the Draper, Utah City Council. Stenquist was elected to the Utah House of Representatives in November 2018 and assumed office on January 2, 2019.

References 

Living people
1969 births
People from Tremonton, Utah
University of Utah alumni
People from Draper, Utah
Republican Party members of the Utah House of Representatives